Rogan Clarke (born 28 April 1969) is a South African rower. He competed in the men's eight event at the 1992 Summer Olympics in Barcelona and came in 8th place.

References

External links
 

1969 births
Living people
South African male rowers
Olympic rowers of South Africa
Rowers at the 1992 Summer Olympics
Place of birth missing (living people)